Kashku or Koshku may refer to:
 Koshku, Fars
 Kashku, Hormozgan
 Kashku, Mazandaran